Kugel is a traditional Jewish baked dish.

Kugel may also refer to:
 Kugel fountain, a sculpture consisting of a large granite sphere floating on a thin film of water
 Kugel, a traditional house ornament made of glass, also known as a Friendship ball
 Kugel, a slang term among South African Jews for an overly materialistic and excessively groomed young woman

People with the surname 
 Alexander Kugel (1864–1928), Russian and Soviet theatre critic and editor
 James Kugel (born 1945), biblical scholar and professor
 Michael Kugel (born 1946), Russian viola player and composer

See also 
 120375 Kugel, an asteroid